Dhanaraj may refer to:

People 
Dhanraj (actor), Telugu actor and comedian
Dhanraj Bhagat (1917–1988), Indian sculptor
Dhanraj Giri (1811–1901), Indian abbot of Kailash Ashram
Dhanraj Pillay (born 1968), Indian field hockey player
 Dhanraj Singh (politician) (1944–?), Indian politician
 Dhanraj Singh (boxer) (born 1947), Guyanese boxer
Master Dhanraj, Indian musician and multi-instrumentalist
Dharmakkan Dhanaraj (1950–2017), Indian scholar
John Dhanraj, Indian television host
Rajindra Dhanraj (born 1969), Trinidadian cricket player
Sarit Dhanaraj (1908–1963), Thai military officer and prime minister
Vaishnavi Dhanraj (born 1988), Indian actress

Other 
Dhanraj Baid Jain College, Chennai, India
Dhanraj Mahal, a residence in Mumbai, India
Dhanraj Tamang, a 1978 Bengali film

See also 
Radhakrishnan Dhanarajan (1980–2019), Indian football player